Ministry of Agriculture, Forestry and Fisheries may refer to:

 Ministry of Agriculture, Forestry and Fisheries (Cambodia)
 Ministry of Agriculture, Forestry and Fisheries (Japan)
 Department of Agriculture, Forestry and Fisheries (Niue)
 Department of Agriculture, Forestry and Fisheries (South Africa)
 Minister of Agriculture, Forestry and Fisheries (South Africa)

See also 
 Department of Agriculture, Fisheries and Forestry (disambiguation)
 List of agriculture ministries
 List of forestry ministries